Vibiana is a third-century virgin martyr of the Roman Catholic Church. She is the patroness of the Archdiocese of Los Angeles. Her liturgical feast day is 1 September.

The remains of Vibiana were rediscovered on December 9, 1853, in ancient catacombs near the Appian Way. A marble tablet adorned her tomb upon which was inscribed "to the soul of the innocent and pure Vibiana", above a laurel wreath.  A wreath was a symbol of martyrdom in Early Christianity. 

Since 2002, the relics of Vibiana have been housed in the mausoleum of the Cathedral of Our Lady of the Angels. The former Cathedral of Saint Vibiana in Los Angeles, California was dedicated to her.

Notes

External links

 Saint Vibiana, the Patron of Nobodies at the Cathedrals of California website

Roman Catholic Archdiocese of Los Angeles
3rd-century Christian saints
Burials at the Cathedral of Our Lady of the Angels
Ante-Nicene Christian female saints
3rd-century Roman women